The Rehearsal is an American docu-comedy television series created, written, directed by and starring Nathan Fielder. It premiered on HBO on July 15, 2022, to critical acclaim. In August 2022, the series was renewed for a second season.

Premise 
The Rehearsal features Nathan Fielder helping ordinary people rehearse difficult conversations or life events through the use of sets and actors hired to recreate real situations. The situations can be trivial, like confessing to a lie about educational history, or more complex, like raising a child. Fielder commissions extravagant sets with every detail recreated. He hires actors to inhabit these sets and practice different dialogue trees with his clients dozens of times. Information used to train the actors and build the sets is often collected without the subjects' knowledge.

Production 
The premise for The Rehearsal grew out of Fielder's series Nathan for You. In preparation for the earlier series, Fielder and his team would role-play scenarios to predict how real people would react to his ridiculous suggestions, an exercise that often proved inaccurate. Fielder was inspired by the futility of the human impulse to control one's own future, which he found to be "really funny."

Some of the humor in The Rehearsal is derived from its extravagant sets. In the first episode, Fielder constructs a perfect duplicate of the bar in which the subject's difficult conversation is to take place. He also constructs a duplicate of the subject's house to practice their first conversation.

On August 19, 2022, HBO renewed the series for a second season.

Release 
The series was first teased in 2019 as part of Fielder's deal with HBO. The title The Rehearsal was revealed in June 2021. In June 2022, a teaser was released, and a poster showing a release date of July 15, 2022.

Episodes

Reception

Critical response 
The series has received critical acclaim, with some praising it as one of the best new series of 2022. The review aggregator website Rotten Tomatoes reported a 96% approval rating with an average rating of 9.4/10, based on 54 critic reviews. The website's critics consensus reads, "The Rehearsal gives Nathan Fielder carte blanche to take his absurdist comedy to the limit, which he pushes even further past with deadpan aplomb in what might be his most uncomfortably funny feat yet." Metacritic, which uses a weighted average, assigned a score of 86 out of 100 based on 23 critics, indicating "universal acclaim".

In The New York Times Critic's Pick review, James Poniewozik wrote, "the show has a philosophical core: Is it ever possible to truly understand another person? And there's a tender, even beautiful side to its surreal moments." The Rehearsal has been compared to the work of Charlie Kaufman in Synecdoche, New York and the Tom McCarthy novel Remainder. The show has been described as a spiritual successor to Nathan For You, since both shows share a premise of Fielder helping average people in humorous ways. Vulture described Fielder's "willingness to screw with people" to put them in situations that might embarrass them or cause them to do things that are out of character being the core thread of his work.

The Rehearsal appeared in the top ten on numerous publications' "Best of 2022" lists, including first for Far Out, IndieWire, The Ringer, and ScreenCrush, among others.

Accolades

References

External links 
 
 
 
Why The Rehearsal’s Editing Is So Important to the Final Product

2020s American mockumentary television series
2022 American television series debuts
English-language television shows
HBO original programming
Television series by Home Box Office
Television series featuring reenactments
Television shows set in Brooklyn
Television shows set in Los Angeles
Television shows set in Oregon